Grenda's Bus Services was a bus and coach operator in Melbourne, Australia. As a Melbourne bus company, it operated 23 bus routes under contract to the Victoria State Government. It was purchased by Ventura Bus Lines in January 2012.

History
Grenda's Bus Services was founded in October 1945 when George Grenda purchased four routes from Shaves Bus Service in Dandenong. After being based in Foster Street, Dandenong for 50 years, it moved to a new depot in Cheltenham Road in 2008. In January 2012, it was included in the sale of parent company Grenda Corporation to Ventura Bus Lines.

Fleet
As at May 2014 the fleet consisted of 181 buses and coaches. Grenda's Bus Services had a livery of cream with red stripes. It later adopted the standard white with red and yellow flashes of Grenda Corporation.

References

External links

Bus companies of Victoria (Australia)
Bus transport in Melbourne
Transport companies established in 1945
Transport companies disestablished in 2012
Australian companies disestablished in 2012
Australian companies established in 1945